Sugavasi Palakondrayudu (born July 3, 1946) is an Indian politician.

Personal life
Rayudu was born in Rayachoti Village, Cuddapah district. He passed matriculation at Z.P. High School, Rayachoty. He married on December 3, 1968. He has three sons and one daughter.

Career 
Rayudu was a candidate of Janatha Party and won in Andhra Pradesh state legislative assembly from Rayachoti assembly constituency in Kadapa district in 1978.   He won second time as Independent candidate from Rayachoti assembly constituency in 1983. He joined the Telugu Desam Party and won Lok Sabha Member from Rajampet Lok Sabha constituency in Andhra Pradesh in 1984. He was won from Rayachoti assembly constituency in 1999 and 2004 from Telugu Desam Party.

References 

1946 births
Living people
India MPs 1984–1989
People from Kadapa district
Lok Sabha members from Andhra Pradesh
Telugu Desam Party politicians
Telugu politicians
People from Rayalaseema